Obi Ndefo is an American actor of Nigerian heritage, best known as Bodie Wells on the television drama Dawson's Creek.

Career 
Ndefo is a graduate of Yale University's drama school. He has appeared in episodes of the television series Angel, The West Wing, The Jamie Foxx Show, Stargate SG-1, 3rd Rock from the Sun, Half & Half, Crossing Jordan, Star Trek: Deep Space Nine and Star Trek: Voyager.

He is the founder of the Los Angeles-based non-profit Arts Alliance for Humanity, which supports keeping arts education in public schools and communities. He is also a writer and yoga teacher and a founder of a non-profit fostering the arts and societal wellness.

Personal life 
In 2019, Ndefo lost both of his legs after being hit by a car while coming out of a grocery store.

References

External links

TV.com Page
LA Times Story on Obi Ndefo

Living people
American people of Nigerian descent
Yale School of Drama alumni
Year of birth missing (living people)
Place of birth missing (living people)
20th-century American male actors
21st-century American male actors
American amputees
African-American male actors
20th-century African-American people
21st-century African-American people